Coleophora eucoleos is a moth of the family Coleophoridae. It is found in Turkestan and Uzbekistan.

Adults are on wing in August.

The larvae feed on Astragalus and Ammodendron species. They create a silky, sheath-like, narrow, long and straight or slightly curved case. The caudal end curves downward gradually. There are very indistinct oblique wrinkles on the surface, as well as weak longitudinal grooves. The valve is two-sided. The length of the case is 19–24 mm and it is whitish in color, although it often has a pinkish tinge at end of development. Larvae can be found from the end of April to the beginning of June. Hibernation probably takes place in the egg stage.

References

eucoleos
Moths described in 1973
Moths of Asia